Harold Cope (9 February 1902–1980) was an English footballer who played in the Football League for Barnsley, Blackburn Rovers and Swindon Town.

References

1902 births
1980 deaths
English footballers
Association football goalkeepers
English Football League players
Mexborough Athletic F.C. players
Barnsley F.C. players
Blackburn Rovers F.C. players
Swindon Town F.C. players
Stalybridge Celtic F.C. players
Ollerton Colliery F.C. players